Five Roundabouts to Heaven is a 1953 thriller novel by the British writer John Bingham. It was published in the United States by Dodd Mead using the alternative title The Tender Poisoner. It was his second published novel following his debut My Name Is Michael Sibley the previous year.

Adaptations 
In 1962 it was adapted for an episode of the Alfred Hitchcock Hour television series starring Dan Dailey and Jan Sterling entitled The Tender Poisoner. In 2007 it served as the basis for the film Married Life starring Rachel McAdams and Pierce Brosnan.

References

Bibliography
 Reilly, John M. Twentieth Century Crime & Mystery Writers. Springer, 2015.

1953 British novels
British novels adapted into films
British thriller novels
Novels by John Bingham
British novels adapted into television shows
Victor Gollancz Ltd books